Haji Mohd Abdul Wahid Endut (born 29 September 1957) was the Member of the Parliament of Malaysia for the Kuala Terengganu constituency in Terengganu (2009 to 2013) the Member of the State Assembly of Terengganu for the seat of Wakaf Mempelam (1990 to 2018), sitting as a member of the opposition Pan-Malaysian Islamic Party (PAS).

Abdul Wahid—an ally of PAS leader Abdul Hadi Awang—was elected to Federal Parliament in a by-election for Kuala Terengganu on 17 January 2009 after the death of the incumbent member from the governing Barisan Nasional coalition. Abdul Wahid won the seat by a margin of 2,631 votes.

Abdul Wahid served in the State Assembly of Terengganu since 1990 until 2018. He was a member of the Executive Council before PAS' defeat in the 2004 election.

Election results

References

Living people
1957 births
People from Terengganu
Malaysian Islamic Party politicians
Members of the Dewan Rakyat
Malaysian people of Malay descent
Malaysian Muslims
Members of the Terengganu State Legislative Assembly